The 2010 LSU Tigers football team represented Louisiana State University in the 2010 NCAA Division I FBS football season. The Tigers were led by head coach Les Miles in his 6th season. They played their home games at Tiger Stadium and were members of the Southeastern Conference in the Western Division. They finished the season 11–2, 6–2 in SEC play and were invited to the Cotton Bowl Classic where they defeated Texas A&M 41–24.

Personnel

Coaching staff

Schedule

Schedule Source:

Game summaries

North Carolina

LSU began the 2010 season against North Carolina in the Chick-fil-A Kickoff Game. North Carolina took the field missing 13 key players due to NCAA investigations over relationships with agents and possible academic violations. The Tigers scored first on a 6-yard touchdown pass from Jordan Jefferson to Russell Shepard. After falling behind 10-7, the Tigers scored 23 unanswered points. Shepard gave the Tigers the lead with a 50-yard touchdown run, followed by a safety, then two touchdowns from Patrick Peterson and Rueben Randle, respectively. North Carolina rallied with two touchdowns in the fourth quarter and had an opportunity to score the game-tying touchdown with only seconds remaining. The Tigers defense held their ground and earned a hard-fought 30-24 victory in Atlanta. LSU won its 6th consecutive season opener under head coach Les Miles.

Vanderbilt

The Tigers went on the road in week two to face the Vanderbilt Commodores. After a scoreless first quarter, Russell Shepard got the scoring going with a 30-yard touchdown run. After three straight field goals (two by LSU, one by Vanderbilt), the Tigers put the game away with two touchdown runs by Alfred Blue and Stevan Ridley, respectively. The Tigers defeated the Commodores 27-3 marking a 2-0 start for the 5th consecutive season. Ridley finished the game with a season-high 159 rushing yards. LSU's defense dominated allowing just 135 total yards, and holding Vanderbilt to just 2-13 on third down.

Mississippi State

The Tigers took the field in the season opener at Tiger Stadium against the Mississippi State Bulldogs. In the annual Gold Game, LSU began with 12 consecutive points and shut out the Bulldogs in the first half. After a 1-yard touchdown run by Mississippi State's Vick Ballard, the Tigers responded with a 16-yard run by Jordan Jefferson. LSU put the game away with a 2-yard touchdown run by Stevan Ridley and defeated the Bulldogs 29-7. The Tiger defense forced five interceptions, including two by Patrick Peterson. Josh Jasper kicked a school-record 5 field goals in the victory which gave the Tigers a 3-0 start. With the win, LSU extended its winning streak against Mississippi State to ten games, with their last loss coming in the 1999 season.

West Virginia

In their week four matchup, LSU faced #20 West Virginia. Stevan Ridley scored on a 1-yard touchdown run at the end of the first quarter, and the Tigers held the lead the rest of the game. With 9:39 remaining in the first half, Patrick Peterson scored on a 60-yard punt return touchdown. After the play, Peterson struck the famous Heisman Trophy pose for which he was penalized for excessive celebration. The Tigers went on to defeat the Mountaineers 20-14. LSU relied heavily on its defense and special teams, getting an interception and a fumble recovery from Freshman Tyrann Mathieu, and two field goals from kicker Josh Jasper.

Tennessee

LSU faced Tennessee in week five for the first time since the 2006 season. The game started with a bang with an 83-yard touchdown run by Jordan Jefferson just two minutes into the game. Tennessee answered with just seconds remaining in the first quarter with a 1-yard touchdown run by Tauren Poole. After a scoreless 2nd and 3rd quarter, the game became much more entertaining in the fourth. Tennessee took a 14-10 lead on a 3-yard run by quarterback Matt Simms. LSU drove all the way down the field, but Jarrett Lee threw an interception in the endzone to give the Vols possession. Tennessee took the ball into field goal range, but was stopped on a fourth-and-one to give the ball back the Tigers. Led by Lee, LSU took the ball all the way down to the 2-yard line. Jefferson attempted to run into the end zone, but was stopped short. With the seconds ticking away and without having any timeouts, the Tigers frantically tried to make substitutions and score the go-ahead touchdown. However, with only seconds remaining, LSU's center T-Bob Hebert snapped the ball to an unaware Jefferson, the ball was fumbled, and Tennessee fell on it with no time remaining. The scoreboard in the stadium and on TV read that Tennessee won 14-10, and the two teams started leaving the field. However, Tennessee was penalized for having 13 men on the field when the ball was snapped, and the Tigers got one more untimed down. Stevan Ridley scored the game-winning 1-yard touchdown run, giving LSU the win in dramatic fashion.

Florida

After an unbelievable win against Tennessee, LSU traveled to Gainesville to face the Florida Gators. The Tigers controlled the game at halftime as they held a 20-14 lead. After a scoreless 3rd quarter, Jordan Jefferson scored early in the 4th on a 3-yard touchdown run. The Tigers looked to be in complete control with a 26-14 4th quarter lead, but Florida's Andre Dubose returned the ensuing kickoff 88 yards for a touchdown. The Gators took a 29-26 lead on a 5-yard run by Mike Gillislee with 3 minutes remaining. The Tigers took possession and drove all the way down to the Florida 36-yard line with 35 seconds remaining. Facing fourth-and-three, LSU lined up for a 54-yard field goal. However, holder Derek Helton flipped the ball over his head to kicker Josh Jasper who then ran for the first down. On the next play, Jarrett Lee hit Terrance Toliver for a 28-yard gain, and two plays later the two connected for the game-winning 3-yard touchdown. LSU escaped Gainesville with a hard-fought 33-29 victory, and their first win over Florida since their 2007 BCS National Championship season.

McNeese State

The Tigers returned home in week seven to face McNeese State, the second-winningest football program in the state of Louisiana. The Cowboys scored first, but LSU answered with a 2-yard touchdown run by Stevan Ridley. The Tigers fell behind 10-7 early in the second quarter, but regained the lead on another touchdown run by Ridley. The game was put away with two touchdown runs by Freshman Michael Ford. LSU defeated McNesse 32-10, extending its regular season non-conference winning streak to 32 games, the longest in the nation. With the win, LSU started 7-0 for the first time since 1973. The win also marked the Tiger's 26th straight victory over teams from the state of Louisiana.

Auburn

LSU faced Auburn in week eight in a matchup of the two remaining undefeated teams in the SEC. Eventual Heisman Trophy winner Cam Newton scored the game's first points on a 1-yard touchdown run. With just seconds remaining in the first half, Jordan Jefferson tied the game at 10-10 with a 2-yard touchdown run. In what was considered a Heisman-moment play, Newton ran for a huge 49-yard touchdown giving Auburn a 17-10 lead in the 3rd quarter. Early in the 4th, LSU used a trick play to tie the game 17-17, with running back Spencer Ware tossing a 39-yard touchdown to Rueben Randle. With 5 minutes to play, Auburn's Onterio McCalebb ran for a 70-yard touchdown. LSU was stopped on a fourth-and-six with 3 minutes left to seal the 24-17 win for Auburn. In the victory, Cam Newton set the SEC record for most rushing yards by a quarterback in a single season.

Alabama

s football team
1	2	3	4	Total
6 Alabama	0	7	7	7	21
• #12 LSU	3	0	7	14	24
Location: Baton Rouge, Louisiana
Game start: 2:37 pm
Elapsed time: 3:29
Game attendance: 92,969
Game weather: 62°, Sunny
Referee: Matt Austin
TV announcers (CBS): Verne Lundquist (play-by-play), Gary Danielson (color), Tracy Wolfson (sideline)
Sources:[96][97]
Coming off their bye week and in what was dubbed by some as "Saban Bowl IV," Alabama was upset by their long-time rival, the LSU Tigers 24–21.[98][99][100] LSU scored first on a 45-yard Josh Jasper field goal to take a 3–0 lead.[101] Alabama scored their first points early in the second quarter on a one-yard Greg McElroy touchdown pass to Trent Richardson to take a 7–3 lead at the half.[101]

Both teams traded touchdowns in the third. The Tigers scored first on a 75-yard Rueben Randle reception from Jordan Jefferson, and the Crimson Tide responded with a five-yard Mark Ingram touchdown run.[101] LSU scored 14 fourth quarter points to secure the victory with a pair of Jasper field goals and a one-yard Stevan Ridley touchdown run and a successful two-point conversion.[101] Alabama responded with a nine-yard Julio Jones touchdown reception, but was unable to get a defensive stop late in the game preserving the 24–21 LSU victory.[101] Turnovers proved costly for Alabama with LSU scoring field goals on drives after a McElroy interception in the first and fumble in the fourth.[101] The loss brought Alabama's all-time record against the Tigers to 45–24–5.[102]

Louisiana-Monroe

 With this victory, LSU extends its winning streak in non-conference games to 33, the longest in the nation.

Ole Miss

LSU leads this series 55–39–4
The Rebels have won in their past 2 meetings, but their last win prior to that was in 2001

Arkansas

LSU leads this series 34–19–2
Their last 3 meetings have been decided by 3 points or less, 2 of which going into overtime

Texas A&M – Cotton Bowl Classic

LSU leads the series, 26–20–3

Statistics

Passing

Rushing

Team

Scores by quarter

Rankings

LSU Tigers in the 2011 National Football League Draft 

Source:

See also
 2010 Southeastern Conference football season
 2010 NCAA Division I FBS football season
 2010 NCAA Division I FBS football rankings

References

LSU
LSU Tigers football seasons
Cotton Bowl Classic champion seasons
LSU Tigers football